The Ploștini is a left tributary of the river Albac in Romania. It discharges into the Albac in Horea.

References

Rivers of Romania
Rivers of Alba County